Tukla may refer to:

 Tüklə, a village in Azerbaijan
 Tukla, Leh, a village in India
 Tukla Bagh, a village in Iran